The 1804 United States presidential election in Vermont took place between November 2 and December 5, 1804, as part of the 1804 United States presidential election. The state legislature chose six representatives, or electors to the Electoral College, who voted for President and Vice President.

During this election, Vermont cast six electoral votes for Democratic Republican incumbent Thomas Jefferson.

See also
 United States presidential elections in Vermont

References

Vermont
1804
1804 Vermont elections